CatholicVote.org is a conservative, non-profit political advocacy group based in the United States. While the organization acknowledges the authority of the Magisterium, it is independent of the Catholic Church.

Structure 
CatholicVote.org is divided into three organizations:

CatholicVote.org, a project of Fidelis, a Catholic organization.

CatholicVote.org Political Action Committee is an affiliated non-partisan political action committee which assists selected candidates in their election campaigns. CatholicVote PAC is the group's connected political action committee; its goal is to "provide qualified candidates with direct financial support while working independently to mobilize voters to elect candidates whom we believe will be faithful stewards of Catholic social teaching and the common good." In 2010, it made campaign contributions to six Republicans and one Democrat.

CatholicVote.org Education Fund is a 501(c)3 tax-deductible program which comprises two units: the CatholicVote.org Education Fund and the CatholicVote.org Legal Action Fund.

History

Domain name
The CatholicVote.org domain name was first used by the Catholic Alliance in early 2000. The Catholic Alliance was a grassroots group of Americans who agreed with the platform of the fundamental evangelical Protestant Christian Coalition but wished to widen the Coalition's scope to include Catholics. The Catholic Alliance, formed in 1995, held the website until mid-2002. The next owner of the domain name was Larry Cirignano, founder of Catholic Vote, later called Catholic Citizenship. He used the domain for six years until mid-2008. The Fidelis Center began operating the domain in October 2008, initially redirecting it to CatholicVote.com. The first published articles linked on the site included ones by co-founders Brian Burch and Joshua Mercer.  The Fidelis Center subsequently sold the domain to Fidelis, a related, but independent 501(c)4 organization which operates the domain today.

Fidelis
CatholicVote.org is run under the umbrella of the Fidelis Center, a Catholic non-profit group. "Imagine Spot 1" was the first release of the national media campaign "Life: Imagine the Potential" in 2009. In ten days it recorded over 700,000 hits. The commercial centers around the story of President Barack Obama, showing an ultrasound image and saying that despite a hard childhood, the unborn child will grow up to be President of the United States. The advert was rejected by both NBC for airing during the Super Bowl and CNN for airing during coverage of President Obama's first State of the Union Address.

The second commercial was also released in 2009, "Imagine Spot 2". This commercial featured Nelson Mandela. It was aired in selected markets during the American Idol season 8 finale.

In 2010 CatholicVote.org organized a petition urging the United States Postal Service to move forward with issuing a Mother Teresa commemorative stamp despite opposition by the Freedom From Religion Foundation and similar groups.

Controversy
On June 25, 2015, one day before same-sex marriage became legal everywhere in the United States, CatholicVote.org uploaded a video onto YouTube called "Not Alone". The video features Catholic people who oppose same-sex marriage defending this belief, saying that people should not hate or dislike those who oppose same-sex marriage. It quickly received a minimum of a million views on YouTube, where it received a massive backlash due to the video's message. On YouTube, "Not Alone" both received many more dislikes than likes and received many negative comments. Parodies of the video appeared very quickly., and many websites condemned it, calling the participants "bigots" or "anti-gay".

CatholicVote.org president Brian Burch said "literally tens of thousands of people are emailing, saying: 'thank you for speaking up for me. I don't agree with the Supreme Court decision, but I don't hate anyone.'"

In June 2022, CatholicVote.org urged parents to check out any LGBT-themed books at their local libraries so that no children will be able to see them.

See also

Catholic Church and politics in the United States
Homosexuality and Roman Catholicism
Catholic Church and abortion
American Life League

References

External links
Official website
"Imagine Spot 1" from the campaign "Life: Imagine the Potential"

Organizations based in Madison, Wisconsin
Catholicism and politics
Organizations established in 2008
Anti-abortion organizations in the United States
American Christian political organizations
Catholic Church and abortion
2015 controversies in the United States
2015 in LGBT history
2015 in American politics
Political controversies in the United States
Religious controversies in the United States
Same-sex marriage in the United States
Conservative organizations in the United States